Atrichozancla gymnopalpa is a moth in the family Lecithoceridae. It was described by Anthonie Johannes Theodorus Janse in 1963. It is found in Zimbabwe.

References

Moths described in 1963
Atrichozancla